Aleksandr Nikulin (Александр Никулин) is a Donetsk People's Republic supreme court judge since 2019. In 2022, during the 2022 Russian invasion of Ukraine, he presided the trial of captured Ukrainian and foreign soldiers who surrendered following the Siege of Mariupol and Azovstal plant. The event was described as a show trial, ending in June 2022 with death penalty to foreign prisoners Britons Aiden Aslin, Shaun Pinner, and Moroccan Brahim Saadoune, Nikulin describing them as "Nazi". On November 4, 2022, Nikulin was shot by unknown attackers in Vuhlehirsk and left in critical condition, in what appears to be an assassination attempt. Denis Pushilin, leader of the DPR, accuses Ukraine of commanding the assassination.

References 

People of the Donetsk People's Republic